In signal processing, specifically control theory, bounded-input, bounded-output (BIBO) stability is a form of stability for signals and systems that take inputs. If a system is BIBO stable, then the output will be bounded for every input to the system that is bounded.

A signal is bounded if there is a finite value  such that the signal magnitude never exceeds , that is
For discrete-time signals: 
For continuous-time signals:

Time-domain condition for linear time-invariant systems

Continuous-time necessary and sufficient condition
For a continuous time linear time-invariant (LTI) system, the condition for BIBO stability is that the impulse response, be absolutely integrable, i.e., its L1 norm exists.

Discrete-time sufficient condition
For a discrete time LTI system, the condition for BIBO stability is that the impulse response be absolutely summable, i.e., its  norm exists.

Proof of sufficiency
Given a discrete time LTI system with impulse response  the relationship between the input  and the output  is

where  denotes convolution. Then it follows by the definition of convolution

 (by the triangle inequality)

 

If  is absolutely summable, then  and

The proof for continuous-time follows the same arguments.

Frequency-domain condition for linear time-invariant systems

Continuous-time signals 

For a rational and continuous-time system, the condition for stability is that the region of convergence (ROC) of the Laplace transform includes the imaginary axis. When the system is causal, the ROC is the open region to the right of a vertical line whose abscissa is the real part of the "largest pole", or the pole that has the greatest real part of any pole in the system. The real part of the largest pole defining the ROC is called the abscissa of convergence. Therefore, all poles of the system must be in the strict left half of the s-plane for BIBO stability.

This stability condition can be derived from the above time-domain condition as follows:

where  and 

The region of convergence must therefore include the imaginary axis.

Discrete-time signals 

For a rational and discrete time system, the condition for stability is that the region of convergence (ROC) of the z-transform includes the unit circle. When the system is causal, the ROC is the open region outside a circle whose radius is the magnitude of the pole with largest magnitude. Therefore, all poles of the system must be inside the unit circle in the z-plane for BIBO stability.

This stability condition can be derived in a similar fashion to the continuous-time derivation:

The region of convergence must therefore include the unit circle.

See also 
 LTI system theory
 Finite impulse response (FIR) filter
 Infinite impulse response (IIR) filter
 Nyquist plot
 Routh–Hurwitz stability criterion
 Bode plot
 Phase margin
 Root locus method
 Input-to-state stability

Further reading

Gordon E. Carlson Signal and Linear Systems Analysis with Matlab second edition, Wiley, 1998, 
John G. Proakis and Dimitris G. Manolakis Digital Signal Processing Principals, Algorithms and Applications third edition, Prentice Hall, 1996, 
D. Ronald Fannin, William H. Tranter, and Rodger E. Ziemer Signals & Systems Continuous and Discrete fourth edition, Prentice Hall, 1998, 
Proof of the necessary conditions for BIBO stability.
Christophe Basso Designing Control Loops for Linear and Switching Power Supplies: A Tutorial Guide first edition, Artech House, 2012, 978-1608075577

References

Signal processing
Digital signal processing
Articles containing proofs
Stability theory